Trachylepis brauni, also known commonly as Braun's mabuya and the Ukinga montane skink, is a species of lizard in the family Scincidae. The species is found in Tanzania and Malawi.

Etymology
The specific name, brauni, is in honor of German zoologist Rudolf H. Braun (born 1908).

Geographic range
T. brauni is found in the Southern Highlands in Tanzania and in the Nyika Plateau in Malawi.

Habitat

Reproduction
T. brauni is viviparous.

References

Further reading
Spawls S, Howell K, Hinkel H, Menegon M (2018). Field Guide to East African Reptiles, Second Edition. London: Bloomsbury Natural History. 624 pp. . (Trachylepis brauni, p. 136).
Tornier G (1902). "Herpetologisch Neues aus Deutsch-Ost-Afrika ". Zoologische Jahrbücher. Abtheilung für Systematik, Geographie und Biologie der Thiere 15: 578–590. (Mabuia brauni, new species, pp. 585–586). (in German).

Trachylepis
Skinks of Africa
Reptiles of Malawi
Reptiles of Tanzania
Reptiles described in 1902
Taxa named by Gustav Tornier